The 1st constituency of the Loiret (French: Première circonscription du Loiret) is a French legislative constituency in the Loiret département. Like the other 576 French constituencies, it elects one MP using a two round electoral system.

Description

The 1st Constituency of the Loiret stretches from the western suburbs of Orléans towards the western edge of department.

In common with the department as a whole the seat has historically tended towards the centre right.

Assembly Members

Election results

2022

 
 
 
|-
| colspan="8" bgcolor="#E9E9E9"|
|-

2017

 
 
 
 
 
 
 
|-
| colspan="8" bgcolor="#E9E9E9"|
|-

2012

 
 
 
 
 
 
|-
| colspan="8" bgcolor="#E9E9E9"|
|-

References

1